The Western al-Hasakah offensive, dubbed Operation Commander Rûbar Qamishlo by the Kurds, was a military operation during May 2015 in the Al-Hasakah Governorate, during the Syrian Civil War, conducted by Kurdish YPG and allied forces against the Islamic State of Iraq and the Levant. On 31 May 2015, as most of the offensive operations in the western Al-Hasakah Governorate ended, the part of the offensive in the Ras al-Ayn District expanded into the Tell Abyad region, in the northern Raqqa Governorate.

Background

The offensive

Tell Tamer countryside and Mount Abd al-Aziz

On 6 May 2015, Kurdish forces launched an offensive in the area of Tell Tamer to recapture territory they had previously lost to ISIL. Over the next three days, the YPG advanced in the Aalyah area, northwest of Tell Tamer, and elsewhere, while backed up by U.S.-led Coalition air-strikes.

On the fourth day of the offensive, Kurdish Commander Rûbar Qamishlo, per whom the operation was named, was heavily wounded. Commander Qamishlo died of his wounds on 14 May.

On 10 May, the YPG advanced on the road between Tell Tamer and Aleppo. On 11 May, the YPG advanced in the al-Salihiyyi area and continued advancing northwest of Tell Tamer the following day, eventually capturing the Alya area by 13 May.

On 15 May, the YPG, backed up by the Syriac MFS and Khabour Guards, advanced in the Tal Hormoz area amid continuing fighting and an ISIL car-bomb attack. Two days later, the YPG captured parts of Tal Hormoz amid mutual bombardment by both sides and an ISIL suicide car-bomb attack, while clashes also took place around Razaza village where Coalition air-strikes took place.

On 18 May, the YPG-led forces captured two villages overlooking the road towards Mount Abdulaziz. On the following day, the YPG captured another three villages on the road heading towards the mountain, as ISIL hit them with two suicide car-bombs. In all, between 17 and 19 May, the YPG captured about 20 villages.

On 20 May, the YPG and allied forces captured wide parts of the mountain. In addition, on 21 May, they seized the village of Aghaybesh, located on the road between Qamishli and Aleppo.

On 21 May, Kurdish-led forces captured the Assyrian villages of Tal Shamira and Tal Nasri, as well as two other villages. Thus, they completed the first stage of their two-week offensive successfully, recapturing Christian villages that ISIL took control of three months earlier and seizing Mount Abd al-Aziz.

Ras al-Ayn countryside
On 26 May, the YPG captured the town of Mabrouka, in the border area of Ras al-Ayn, bringing them closer to the ISIL-held border town of Tell Abyad, then a major transit point for ISIL black-market oil commerce and foreign fighters from Turkey.

In all, since 6 May, the YPG and allied forces captured 4,000 square kilometers of territory throughout the western Al-Hasakah Governorate, including 230 towns, villages and farmlands.

After the capture of Mabrouka, the YPG launched attacks on ISIL-held villages on the border. The Kurds claimed that 184 ISIL fighters were killed between 25 and 28 May.

On 29 May, the YPG captured the entire countryside of Ras al-Ayn, as they continued the second phase of their campaign. Later that day, clashes on the administrative boundary between Al-Hasakah and Raqqa provinces took place that left 30 civilians dead at Nis Tal, on the Syrian–Turkish border, according to SOHR. In contrast, Kurdish sources claimed nearly 100 people were massacred. The civilians were killed by ISIL while trying to escape an advance by the jihadists. Meanwhile, the Kurds executed 20 civilians on the charges of supporting ISIL and burned and demolished homes of suspected ISIL supporters near Tell Tamer and Ras al-Ayn.

On 31 May 2015, Kurdish forces pushed beyond the provincial boundary between the Al-Hasakah and Raqqa Governorates, thus ending the offensive operations within the western Al-Hasakah Governorate.

Aftermath

On 30 May, ISIL launched an offensive towards the Syrian government-controlled part of Al-Hasakah, and advanced in the city's outskirts after two suicide bombers targeted Syrian Army positions, killing and wounding 50 soldiers. The offensive originated from the ISIL-held town of Al-Shaddadah, south of Al-Hasakah, and was the jihadist organizations's third assault on the city in 2015.

On 31 May, Kurdish forces seized four villages on the provincial boundary between Al-Hasakah and Raqqa. The SOHR also reported that clashes were continuing between YPG and ISIL forces to the southwest of Ras al-Ayn.

On 15 July 2015, an ISIL militant attempted to carry out a suicide attack in the area between Tell Brak and al-Hawl; however, he was captured by the YPG, and the explosives were disarmed.

On 17 July, three ISIL militants attacked the village of Nestal, to the west of the town of Mabrouka. One of the militants was reportedly killed, while another fled across the border into Turkey.

On 8 August 2015, ISIL militants carried out an attack on the village of Abu Hamal, to the south of Tell Hamis. The YPG and YPJ counterattacked, forcing ISIL to withdraw from the region.

See also

Autonomous Administration of North and East Syria
Rojava conflict
American-led intervention in Iraq (2014–present)
List of wars and battles involving ISIL

References

External links
 Operation Inherent Resolve airstrike updates
 ISIL frontline maps (Syria) 
 Khabur Valley offensive frontline maps

Military operations of the Syrian civil war in 2015
Military operations of the Syrian civil war involving the Islamic State of Iraq and the Levant
Military operations of the Syrian civil war involving the People's Protection Units
Al-Hasakah Governorate in the Syrian civil war